The discography of Japanese musician Chara consists of fifteen studio albums, four compilation albums, two live albums, three extended plays one soundtrack, eight video albums and fifty singles. Chara debuted as a musician in 1991 with Sony Music Entertainment Japan, and saw great success with the singles "Swallowtail Butterfly (Ai no Uta)" (1996), the theme song for the film Swallowtail, and "Yasashii Kimochi" (1997). After releasing ten albums with the label, Chara left Sony in 2004 to become an independent musician, releasing the album Something Blue (2005). The next year, Chara signed her second major label contract with Universal Music Japan, releasing four albums between 2007 and 2011.

After a second brief period where she worked independently, releasing the extended play Utakata (2011), Chara signed a contract with Sony sublabel Ki/oon Music, releasing the albums Cocoon (2012), Jewel (2013) and Secret Garden (2015).

Albums

Studio albums

Live albums

Compilation albums

Self-cover albums

Soundtrack albums

Extended plays

Singles

As a lead artist

As a featured artist

Promotional singles

Other appearances

Video albums

Notes

References

Pop music discographies
Discographies of Japanese artists